Events from the year 1565 in Sweden

Incumbents
 Monarch – Eric XIV

Events

 January - The Swedes sack the Danish provinces of Scania and Halland under Klas Horn.
 21 May - Swedish victory in the Sea Battle in Pomerania. 
 4 June - Action of 4 June 1565
 9 June - The Teutonic Order declares war against Sweden in Livonia.
 7 July - Action of 7 July 1565
 July - The Danes burn Swedish Lödöse.
 13 August  - Swedish victory at the Battle of Obermühlenberg. 
 28 August - Danish Varberg is conquered by the Swedes.
 8 September - Princess Cecilia of Sweden arrives on her official visit to England. Among the persons in her retinue is Helena Snakenborg.
 20 October - Battle of Axtorna
 - Sweden is struck by the plague.

Births

 10 November - Laurentius Paulinus Gothus, theologian, astronomer and archbishop (died 1646)

Deaths

References

 
Years of the 16th century in Sweden
Sweden